Syed Ali Mujtaba Shah Bokhari (born April 5, 1996 in Lahore) is a professional squash player who represented Pakistan. He reached a career-high world ranking of World No. 133 in April 2013.

References

External links

1996 births
Living people
Pakistani male squash players